Sion Cathedral or the Cathedral of Our Lady of Sion is the Roman Catholic cathedral in Sion, Valais, Switzerland. It is the seat of the Diocese of Sion.

The cathedral, in the Byzantine style, contains several Roman inscriptions, 15 altars, and many fonts.

References

Bibliography

External links
Cathedral page in French

Buildings and structures in Valais
Roman Catholic cathedrals in Switzerland